Tortona Calcio may refer to one of two football clubs from Tortona:

 Derthona F.B.C. 1908,  founded in 1908, currently in serie D.
 A.P.D. Tortona Villalvernia founded in 1983, currently  in Serie D.